A Man Is Mostly Water is 2000 American comedy film written by, directed by and starring Fred Parnes. It was Anton Yelchin's film debut.

Plot

Cast
Fred Parnes as Roper
Christopher Rydell as Andy
Mark Curry as Jeff
Paulina Mielech as Lily
Linda Pine as Amanda
Heather Roop as Jaime
Anton Yelchin as Augie
Richard Edson as Bud Guy
Mark Rydell as Distributor
Bill Pullman as Parking Fascist
Lou Rawls as Mailman
Peter Barton as Jack
Phil LaMarr as Testifier

References

External links
 

American comedy films
2000 comedy films
2000 films
2000s English-language films
2000s American films